Shri S.N. Mishra was former Secretary-General of 11th Lok Sabha and Lok Sabha Secretariat, from 15 May 1996 to 15 July 1996 for a short period. Lok Sabha is a Lower House of the Parliament of India.

References

India MPs 1996–1997
Secretaries General of the Lok Sabha